Epic Recordings is a compilation album drawing from Lynne's three Epic albums, Sunrise, Tough All Over, and Soft Talk. The album was released on September 19, 2000.

Critical reception

William Ruhlmann of AllMusic noted that the "album is not billed as a 'best-of'", and concluded that it was instead "the rest of Shelby Lynne."

The Los Angeles Times advised that listeners avoid the album "until [they] know exactly what's involved", and explained that the majority of its content is from the era in which Lynne "wasn’t allowed to pursue her musical instincts [when recording]. Instead she was encouraged to make records in a radio-friendly country style."

Country Standard Time stated that the album's "eclecticism" demonstrates why Lynne "has always been a marketing person's nightmare", while emphasizing that "as a singer, she's rarely a let down to anybody".

Track listing

Track information and credits adapted from the album's liner notes.

References

2000 compilation albums
Shelby Lynne albums
Epic Records compilation albums